Serg Simon (born July 3, 1967) is a former French rugby union player and a physician. He previously played for Union Bordeaux Begles, AS Merginac, Stade Bordelais and Stade Francais in France before playing for English side Gloucester Rugby

Simon made his debut for France in 1991 where he scored his only try in a Test match against Romania won at 33-21. He represented France in another Test match against the United States in the same year, where they were victorious 41-9.

Honours
 Stade Français
French Rugby Union Championship/Top 14: 1997–98

References

1967 births
French rugby union players
Sportspeople from Nice
Living people
France international rugby union players
Rugby union props
CA Bordeaux-Bègles Gironde players
Stade Bordelais players
Stade Français players
Gloucester Rugby players
French expatriate rugby union players
French expatriate sportspeople in England
Expatriate rugby union players in England